Alexander Nikolayevich Maltsev (born 20 April 1949) is a Soviet-Russian former professional ice hockey forward and politician.

Maltsev began his sports career at the Olimpiya Kirovo-Chepetsk of his hometown of Kirovo-Chepetsk (1966-1967, first coach N. I. Poles). He then played for Dynamo Moscow in the Soviet League for 530 games from 1967 to 1984. He was one of the few Soviet stars not to play for CSKA Moscow. A six-time Soviet all-star, he led the league in scoring in 1970–71 and tied with Valeri Kharlamov for MVP in 1971–72.

Maltsev was on the USSR team during the 1972 Winter Olympics, 1976 Winter Olympics, and 1980 Winter Olympics, winning gold in 1972 and 1976 and silver in 1980. He was named the best forward at the IIHF World Championships three times, leading the tournament in goals once and total scoring twice. He made the world championship all-star team on five occasions. Maltsev's 213 career goals in international play were the most by any Soviet player. According to NHL.com, Maltsev was Alexander Ovechkin's childhood idol.

Maltsev was awarded the Medal For Labour Heroism in 1972, the Order of the Badge of Honor in 1976 and the Order of the Red Banner of Labour in 1978.

Career statistics

Regular season

Soviet totals do not include numbers from the 1968–69 to 1969–70 seasons.

International

Politics
In 2016, he ran for the State Duma election from A Just Russia party, coming in second in his constituency to a United Russia candidate.

References

External links

 Alexander Maltsev at Hockey CCCP International

1949 births
A Just Russia politicians
21st-century Russian politicians
Dynamo sports society athletes
HC Dynamo Moscow players
Ice hockey players at the 1972 Winter Olympics
Ice hockey players at the 1976 Winter Olympics
Ice hockey players at the 1980 Winter Olympics
IIHF Hall of Fame inductees
Living people
Medalists at the 1972 Winter Olympics
Medalists at the 1976 Winter Olympics
Medalists at the 1980 Winter Olympics
Olympic gold medalists for the Soviet Union
Olympic ice hockey players of the Soviet Union
Olympic medalists in ice hockey
Olympic silver medalists for the Soviet Union
People from Kirovo-Chepetsk
Soviet expatriate ice hockey players
Soviet expatriate sportspeople in Hungary
Soviet ice hockey right wingers
Russian ice hockey right wingers
Újpesti TE (ice hockey) players